Oliver John Whitley (1912 – 2005), son of J. H. Whitley, was a broadcasting administrator who worked for most of his life for the BBC.

Early life and education
Born 12 February 1912 in Halifax, Yorkshire, the third child and second son of John Henry Whitley and his wife Margherita. Like his father, Oliver was a boarder in Wiseman's House, Clifton College where he was resident between 1925 and 1930. He read history and law at New College, Oxford and qualified as a barrister. He married Elspeth Catherine Forrester-Paton in May 1939; the couple had four sons and one daughter.

Career
Oliver joined the BBC in 1935 and, at the outbreak of World War II moved to the Monitoring Service at Wood Norton monitoring Nazi broadcasts. He resigned in 1941 following a dispute over the proposal to move the unit to Caversham Park.

He enlisted with the RVNR, serving in Europe including the Dieppe raid and the Normandy landings and the Far East in the Malaya landings and liberation of Singapore.

On demobilisation in 1946, he rejoined and remained with the BBC until his retirement. He had a long and influential career, much of which was with the External Services

Later life
He retired in 1972, with his wife, to Oban. He died on 22 March 2005 in Benderloch, Argyll, at the age of 93.

References

1912 births
People from Halifax, West Yorkshire
People educated at Clifton College
2005 deaths